Taqiabad (also Romanized as Taqīābād) is a village in Takht-e Jolgeh Rural District, in the Central District of Firuzeh County, Razavi Khorasan Province, Iran. At the 2006 census, its population was 832, in 218 families.

References 

Populated places in Firuzeh County